Aleksije (Aleksej) Jelačić (January 10, 1892 – October 24, 1941) was a Serbian historian.

Jelačić was born in Kiev to a family of South Slavic descent; reportedly his ancestors moved to Russia in the 18th century from the Habsburg Empire. His ancestors came from Croatia.

He became a senior lecturer at the Saint Vladimir University in Kiev. He emigrated to the Kingdom of Serbs, Croats and Slovenes in 1920 and earned his doctor of philosophy from the University of Ljubljana in 1924.  He then became a professor at the University in Skopje.

Jelačić authored research on historical and literary themes including protopope Avvakum, Dostoevsky, the history of Russia, Russian revolution, and history of Czechoslovakia, Poland, and other Slavic countries.

He died in Belgrade in 1941.

Books 
Russian revolution and its origin. – Zagreb 1925.
History of Russia. – Belgrade 1929.
Czechoslovak history. – Belgrade 1930.
On rotten. – Skopje 1933.
History of Poland. – Skopje 1933.
Russian social thought of the 19th century. – Belgrade 1934.
Modern Czechoslovakia. – Skopje 1938.
Russia and the Balkans. Belgrade 1940.

References

1892 births
1941 deaths
Historians from the Russian Empire
Male writers from the Russian Empire
Academic staff of the National University of Kyiv-Mohyla Academy
Soviet emigrants to Yugoslavia
20th-century Serbian historians
Serbian people of Russian descent
Academic staff of the Ss. Cyril and Methodius University of Skopje
University of Ljubljana alumni
20th-century male writers